Le Fresne is a former commune in the Eure department in the Normandy region in northern France. On 1 January 2018, it was merged into the new commune of Le Val-Doré.

Population

See also
Communes of the Eure department

References

Former communes of Eure